Vishal Marwaha (born 8 May 1976, in Glasgow) is a Scottish field hockey player. He has more than 200 outdoor caps for Scotland and Great Britain.
He played all his career at Western Wildcats. He debuted in the first team in 1996 and gained his first Scotland cap in 1997. He captained Western Wildcats for three seasons from 2003 to 2006.
He retired from playing in 2011 after winning a final Scottish Cup. He took over as 1st team coach at Wildcats for the season 2011-12
He lives in Glasgow.

References

1976 births
Living people
Scottish people of Indian descent
Field hockey players from Glasgow
Scottish male field hockey players
Field hockey players at the 2006 Commonwealth Games
Commonwealth Games competitors for Scotland